Łódź Andrzejów is a railway station located in the city of Łódź, in Andrzejów estate, which itself is a part of Widzew district. It was opened in 1865 as one of the stations located between Łódź and Koluszki. The station was incorporated into the city in 1988. Currently it is used mostly by commuter trains, as well as freight trains carrying aggregate to the unloading ramp, which has its branch track going out of station.

Train services
The station is served by the following services:

 InterRegio services (IR) Łódź Fabryczna — Warszawa Glowna 
 InterRegio services (IR) Łódź Kaliska — Warszawa Glowna 
 InterRegio services (IR) Ostrów Wielkopolski — Łódź — Warszawa Główna
 InterRegio services (IR) Poznań Główny — Ostrów Wielkopolski — Łódź — Warszawa Główna
 Regional services (PR) Łódź Fabryczna — Częstochowa 
 Regional services (PR) Łódź Kaliska — Częstochowa 
 Regional services (PR) Łódź Kaliska — Skarżysko-Kamienna

References 

Railway stations in Poland opened in 1865
Andrzejów
Railway stations served by Łódzka Kolej Aglomeracyjna
Railway stations served by Przewozy Regionalne InterRegio